100% Hits: The Best of 2007 is a 2-disc compilation album released by EMI Music Australia and Warner Music Australia. The album was the #10 compilation album on the year-end charts in Australia for the year 2007 (see 2007 in music). It has also been certified platinum in Australia for selling over 70,000 units.

Track listing

Disk 1
Silverchair – "Straight Lines" (4:16)
Kisschasy – "Opinions Won't Keep You Warm at Night" (3:04)
Thirsty Merc – "20 Good Reasons" (3:46)
Missy Higgins – "Steer" (3:47)
Ben Lee – "Love Me Like the World Is Ending" (3:44)
Sneaky Sound System – "UFO" (3:43)
Alex Gaudino featuring Crystal Waters – "Destination Calabria" (2:59)
Fedde Le Grand – "Put Your Hands Up 4 Detroit" (2:24)
Bob Sinclar and Cutee B featuring Dollarman, Big Ali and Makedah – "Rock This Party (Everybody Dance Now)" (3:17)
Ricki-Lee – "Can't Touch It" (2:52)
Robbie Williams – "Lovelight" (3:59)
Gym Class Heroes – "Clothes Off!!" (3:40)
Jamelia – "Something About You" (3:21)
Lily Allen – "LDN" (3:09)
Evermore – "Never Let You Go" (4:14)
Thirty Seconds to Mars – "The Kill" (3:51)
Mims – "This Is Why I'm Hot" (4:16)
Cassie – "Me & U" (3:12)
Joss Stone – "Tell Me 'bout It" (2:50)
Hilary Duff – "With Love" (3:01)
Gia Farrell – "Hit Me Up" (3:14)
Fonzerelli – "Moonlight Party" (Aaron McClelland Summer Mix) (2:53)
Armand Van Helden – "NYC Beat" (3:10)

Disk 2
KT Tunstall – "Suddenly I See" (3:11)
The Cat Empire – "No Longer There" (3:45)
Eskimo Joe – "Sarah" (3:29)
Operator Please – "Just a Song About Ping Pong" (2:17)
John Butler Trio – "Funky Tonight" (3:40)
The Beautiful Girls – "I Thought About You" (3:11)
The Waifs – "Sun Dirt Water" (3:34)
Paolo Nutini – "Jenny Don't Be Hasty" (3:26)
Regina Spektor – "Fidelity" (3:46)
Josh Pyke – "Lines on Palms" (3:00)
Crowded House – "Don't Stop Now" (3:51)
Katie Noonan – "Time to Begin" (3:38)
Paul Kelly – "God Told Me To" (3:39)
Jet – "Rip It Up" (3:20)
Airbourne – "Too Much, Too Young, Too Fast" (3:42)
The Used – "The Bird and the Worm" (3:46)
Panic! at the Disco – "But It's Better If You Do" (3:27)
Garbage – "Tell Me Where It Hurts" (4:07)
The Chemical Brothers – "Do It Again" (3:35)
Bodyrox featuring Luciana – "Yeah Yeah" (D. Ramirez Radio Edit) (2:38)
David Guetta vs. The Egg – "Love Don't Let Me Go (Walking Away)" (Joachim Garraud Radio Edit) (3:14)
Cascada – "Everytime We Touch" (3:17)
Eric Prydz vs. Floyd – "Proper Education" (3:19)

References

External links
warnermusic.com.au
musichead.com.au
emigroup.com

2007 compilation albums
EMI Records compilation albums
Warner Music Group compilation albums